Christopher Chandler (born 1960) is a New Zealand-born billionaire and founder of Dubai-based investment company Legatum which also provides funding for UK media channel GB News. According to The Guardian, he has a net worth of US$1.7 billion.

Chandler has been called "one of the world's greatest contrarian investors" by Fortune magazine. Chandler is a funder of the Legatum Institute.

Early life
Born in Matangi, Chandler is the son of beekeepers Robert and Marija Chandler, who launched and operated Chandler House, a department store in Hamilton, New Zealand. He attended the University of Auckland, earning a degree in law in 1982.

In 1982, Christopher and his older brother, Richard, took over the business and expanded it to ten stores, adding fashion design, manufacturing and real estate, before starting to look for international investment opportunities.

Career

Sovereign Global 
In 1986, the brothers formed investment firm Sovereign Global in Monaco to focus on transitioning industries in Russia, Latin America and Eastern Europe. The business operated by investing in assets which it felt were mispriced in times of uncertainty. The Chandler brothers were among the first and biggest investors in the emerging markets of Brazil, the Czech Republic, and Russia. According to Fortune Magazine, Sovereign “bet big on commercial real estate at the time of the transition in Hong Kong from British to Chinese control, when most of the world was profoundly pessimistic about the city's prospects.”

Together, the brothers deployed a “narrow and deep” investment strategy, steering large portions of a portfolio into few high conviction trades. This strategy runs counter to the diversification strategies typically deployed in the modern investment industry. Christopher’s role in Sovereign’s investment strategy was to project the firm’s investment targets forward five or ten years, with Richard Chandler saying, "No one I know is better at that than Christopher."

One of the company's first major investments was in Hong Kong real estate, a market which investors had fled after the signing of the Sino-British Accord. The company also invested in the Brazilian telecommunications industry, just after the country came out of hyperinflation, and in Russia, just after the fall of communism.

During the Asian banking crisis, the brothers made significant investments in both Japan, including taking stakes in UHJ Holdings, Mizuho Financial Group, Sumitomo Mitsui Banking Corp., and Mitsubishi Tokyo Financial Group. The brothers also took a stake in South Korean refiner SK Corp., where they unsuccessfully tried to "oust" its CEO and Chairman, Chey Tae-won, after Tae-won was convicted and imprisoned on charges of accounting fraud.

In 2002, the brothers were the fourth largest investor in Gazprom, the Russian state-controlled gas company. The dog of their representative on the Board, Boris Fyodorov, was poisoned by cyanide, which allegedly may have been the result of their campaign to clean up the company's governance by appointing the first independent director to the state-controlled gas company.

Legatum 
In 2006, Christopher founded Dubai-based Legatum Capital as an independent venture separate from his brother. The company was co-founded with Mark Stoleson, Philip Vassiliou and Alan McCormick. 

Legatum is a private, multibillion-dollar investment firm that puts money into companies in developing countries as well as the world's capital markets. In April 2012, Legatum acquired its own building in the Dubai International Finance Centre.

Chandler committed US$50 million to build the Legatum Center for Development and Entrepreneurship at MIT in 2008. The Center has partnered with the MasterCard Foundation and other organizations to cultivate leadership, entrepreneurship, and innovation to benefit vulnerable populations.

Legatum created the END Fund in 2012, a private philanthropic foundation with a mission to control and eliminate neglected tropical diseases. Legatum also became co-founders of the Freedom Fund, which it started in 2013 with Pierre Omidyar, to end global slavery labour.

Chandler and his partners then launched the Luminos Fund,  a charitable organization founded in 2016 to bring educational initiatives to third world countries. The company committed US$10 million over 5 years to the Luminos Fund to support these efforts.

Libel lawsuits 
In 2018, British MPs, including Bob Seely, accused Chandler of links to Russian intelligence. Chandler has consistently rejected these claims and the accusations have since been proven false. Following these accusations, Chandler sued Donald Berlin, the original source of the allegations, for US$15 million in a libel suit. The case was initially dismissed on administrative grounds due to the statute of limitations, but in 2021, Chandler successfully revived the libel suit against Berlin in appeals court, enabling Chandler to receive partial compensation and a retraction of the statements by Berlin.

In July 2020, another MP, Steve Baker, defended Chandler in Parliament by noting that he had invested heavily in “fighting the effects of Russian wrongdoing.” Baker also noted that an independent investigation found that the allegations against Chandler and Legatum were totally false and that Legatum had since won many corrections, retractions and apologies from news outlets covering the allegations. Baker therefore proposed that a right to reply be instituted for those accused in Parliament of wrongdoing. Seely replied that Baker had made “a really important point” and noted his support for a right to reply.

In May 2022, Chris Bryant, who joined Seely in making the allegations in 2018, apologised to Chandler in Parliament for the distress his false claims caused  and in July that year, confirmed in the UK High Court that the allegations were untrue. Chandler commented that he was "delighted to be able to put these bizarre and outrageous lies behind us."

Personal life
Chandler has maintained a low public profile and few photographs exist of his likeness, nor much information about his personal life. He enjoys windsurfing, water-skiing and riding motorcycles. Chandler has built computers and written software programs in his spare time.

The Chandler brothers bought La Fleur du Cap in Cap Ferrat for their parents. It was previously owned by David Niven and Charlie Chaplin.

Chandler became a citizen of Malta, a member-state of the European Union, in 2016. When the news of Chandler's Maltese citizenship became public in 2018, one MEP expressed disapproval of his dual citizenship. It subsequently became clear that Chandler was not a Brexiteer, and his application for Maltese citizenship was made before the UK referendum in June 2016. Charles Moore, writing for the Telegraph in May 2018, wrote that Chandler "has never advanced political views or, according to Legatum employees, expressed opinions about Brexit".

References

1960 births
Living people
People from Waikato
New Zealand businesspeople
Maltese businesspeople
New Zealand billionaires
Maltese billionaires
New Zealand people of Croatian descent